The Judica-Cordiglia brothers are two Italian former amateur radio operators who made audio recordings which allegedly support the conspiracy theory that the Soviet space program covered up cosmonaut deaths in the 1960s. The pair claimed to have recorded several failed secret Soviet space missions. These recordings have been the center of public interest for more than 50 years.

Background 
Achille (1933 - 2015) and his brother Giovanni Battista (born 1939) set up their own experimental listening station just outside Turin in the late 1950s. The brothers used a disused German bunker at a site named Torre Bert. Working with scavenged and improvised equipment, they claimed to have successfully monitored transmissions from the Soviet Sputnik program (1 & 2) and Explorer 1, the first American satellite, in 1958 using equipment that recorded flight information such as telemetry, voice recordings and visual data.

Recordings 

In the 1960s, the brothers released recordings alleged to be radio communications taken from secret Soviet Union space missions, including the purported dying sounds of a suffocating lost cosmonaut. In total, the Judica-Cordiglia brothers released nine recordings over a period of four years. As compiled by Kris Hollington of the Fortean Times, a British monthly magazine that popularizes "anomalous phenomena", the quoted list of these is as follows:May 1960 Unnamed cosmonaut lost when his orbiting space capsule veered off course.

November 1960 The brothers picked up an SOS message in Morse code from a troubled spacecraft.

February 1961 Recorded the suffocation of a cosmonaut.

April 1961 Just prior to Yuri Gagarin’s flight, a capsule circled the Earth three times before re-entering the Earth’s atmosphere.

May 1961 Weak calls for help from an orbiting capsule.

October 1961 A Soviet spacecraft veered off course and vanished into deep space.

November 1962 A space capsule bounced off the Earth’s atmosphere during re-entry and disappeared.

May 1963 Unnamed female cosmonaut perished on re-entry.

April 1964 Cosmonaut lost when capsule burnt up on re-entry.

The November 1960 recording, from 28 November, was one of their most famous recordings; in it, after an hour spent listening to static, the two brothers purport to recognize an SOS signal that seemed to be moving away from the Earth. The story was picked up by a Swiss-Italian radio station and the brothers became the station’s space experts. In it, a faint SOS Morse Code signal has been purportedly sent from a troubled spacecraft leaving Earth's orbit. In the May 1961 case, an orbiting spacecraft purportedly makes an appeal for help after going out of control. In the November 1963 case, the brothers said they recorded the voice of a female cosmonaut re-entering the Earth's atmosphere in a malfunctioning spacecraft; in the recording she is heard to have cried out, "I am hot" as it burnt up.

Skepticism over the recordings 

Since the 1960s critical analysis of the recordings has cast doubt on their provenance. For instance, audio transcripts reveal that none of the cosmonauts, who were supposed to be Soviet air force pilots, followed standard communication protocols, such as identifying themselves when speaking or using correct technical terminology. Likewise, some of the recordings contain disjointed sentences and grammatical errors, and the speaker has an accent that does not sound Russian. 

Though some of the transcripts record cosmonauts saying they are leaving Earth's orbit (i.e. heading into interplanetary or "deep" space), the crewed Vostok 3KAs could not reach escape velocity because their designs never contained secondary-burn propulsion units. This fact was inherent to the Vostok programme, a project to put the first Soviet citizens into low Earth orbit and return them to the surface of the planet safely. OKB-1 only required spacecraft with velocities that could reach Earth orbit, far less than the speed needed to break orbit. Propulsion units powerful enough to leave Earth's orbit did not begin to appear until the test firing of the RD-270 engine in 1969, and it was not until the N1 moon rocket (with the NK-33 engines) in 1974 that the Soviets built a spacecraft able to reach open space. It is impossible to "accidentally" veer off into deep space without firing a rocket engine powerful enough to accelerate to escape velocity..  However, the significance of these 1969 and 1974 dates is called into question by evidence that the Soviets had in fact demonstrated an ability to launch probes through escape velocity and beyond the moon (accidentally) at least 10-15 years earlier than this (the first confirmed incident occurring in 1959).  Private Soviet transmissions originating from the lunar surface were also  intercepted in 1966, by scientists at Jodrell Bank Observatory in England, which when decoded were found to include ground-level photographs of lunar terrain.

Legacy 
In 1964 they won the Italian TV quiz show Fiera dei Sogni ('The Fair of Dreams'), which enabled them to visit NASA as their prize.

In 2007, the brothers were the subject of a documentary called  (known in English as 'Space Hackers'). 

Fortean Times published an article on the brothers and their recordings of lost cosmonauts in March 2008. 

A dramatization of the brothers' story, called "Listen Up" by Glen Neath, was broadcast on BBC Radio 4 in May 2009. 
In 2011, the brothers' story was featured on the Science Channel TV show, Dark Matters: Twisted But True. 

In later life, Achille became a cardiologist while Giovanni Battista worked for the Italian police providing phone-taps in criminal investigations.

In March 2020, Giovanni Battista was interviewed by Vice regarding the brothers' story on the Extremes podcast Season 2 Episode 25 titled, "Mystery of the Lost Cosmonauts". It was also featured on a Vice article titled, "These Brothers Were Eavesdropping on Space Transmissions When They Heard Cries for Help", as an accompaniment to the podcast episode.

See also 
 Escape velocity

References

Further reading 
 Dossier Sputnik. ...Questo il mondo non lo saprà... di Judica Cordiglia Achille - Judica Cordiglia G. Battista, 2006

External links 
 Reader's Digest Article
  Italian film on Judica-Cordiglia Brothers 
 The Lost Cosmonauts web site archived from 2018

1933 births
1939 births
Amateur astronomers
20th-century Italian astronomers
Italian conspiracy theorists
European amateur radio operators
Living people
Crewed space program of the Soviet Union
Sibling duos